Ib Planck (2 January 1930 – 9 April 2014) was a Danish long-distance runner. He competed in the men's 5000 metres at the 1952 Summer Olympics.

References

External links
 

1930 births
2014 deaths
Athletes (track and field) at the 1952 Summer Olympics
Danish male long-distance runners
Olympic athletes of Denmark
Place of birth missing